Allendia chilensis is a species of beetle in the family Carabidae, the only species in the genus Allendia.

It is named in honor of former Chilean President Salvador Allende.

References

Harpalinae
Salvador Allende